Abu Ruwaym Ibn Abd ar-Rahman Ibn Abi Naim al-Laythi(70-169AH), better known as Nafi al-Madani, was one of the transmitters of the seven canonical Qira'at, or methods of reciting the Qur'an. Outside of Egypt, his method of Qur'an recitation is the most popular in Africa in general, and his chain of narration returning to the companions of the Islamic prophet Muhammad is well-attested.

Nafi was born in the year 689CE, and he died in the year 785CE. His family was from Isfahan, though he himself was born and died in Medina.

His method of recitation via his two most famous students, Qalun and Warsh, is the most common Quran reading mode in North Africa, West Africa and Qatar. He had a total of four canonical transmitters of his recitation; in addition to Qalun and Warsh, he also transmitted his reading to Isma'il bin Ja'far al-Ansari and Ishaq bin Muhammad al-Musayyabi. Nafi's style of reading became so popular that it eventually eclipsed that of his teachers in Medina.

See also

Ten readers and transmitters 
Nafi‘ al-Madani
Qalun
Warsh
Ibn Kathir al-Makki
Al-Bazzi
Qunbul
Abu 'Amr ibn al-'Ala'
Ad-Duri
Al-Susi
Ibn Amir ad-Dimashqi
Hisham
Ibn Dhakwan
Aasim ibn Abi al-Najud
Shu'bah
Hafs
Hamzah az-Zaiyyat
Khalaf
Khallad
Al-Kisa'i
Al-Layth
Ad-Duri
Abu Ja'far 
'Isa ibn Waddan 
Ibn Jummaz 
Ya'qub al-Yamani 
Ruways 
Rawh 
Khalaf 
Ishaq 
Idris

References

785 deaths
Quranic readings
People from Medina
689 births
Warsh recitation